Lindavista is a neighbourhood in the north of Mexico City, in the administrative district of  Gustavo A. Madero. The streets in Lindavista are named after cities in Latin America.

History
It was founded in 1932 as a result of the planned growth of the city and of the neighbouring suburb of Industrial.

Education
Insurgentes campus of the Sistema Educativo Justo Sierra
Colegio Guadalupe
Instituto Ovalle Monday S. C. - Has its elementary campuses, Primaria Torres Lindavista and Primaria Latacunga, in Lindavista

References

Gustavo A. Madero, Mexico City
Neighborhoods in Mexico City